Harefield is a closed railway station on the Main South railway line in New South Wales, Australia. The station opened in 1878, and closed to passenger trains in the 1980s. The station building survives in a state of considerable disrepair.

Also see Harefield, New South Wales and rail freight terminal operating from 2012.

References

Disused regional railway stations in New South Wales
Railway stations in Australia opened in 1878
Main Southern railway line, New South Wales